The Donald Justice Poetry Prize is a prestigious national competition sponsored by the Iris N. Spencer Poetry Awards of the West Chester University Poetry Center. It has been given annually since 2006 to an American poet for an unpublished book-length manuscript of formal poetry.

Each year, one manuscript is selected for the award  and is published in the spring. The submissions are judged blindly and selected by a notable poet who works in traditional forms. Past judges have included Erica Dawson, David Mason,A. E. Stallings, and Marilyn Nelson.

The winner receives $1,500 and will have the manuscript published by Autumn House Press. Prior to 2018, winning poetry collections were either published by Measure Press or West Chester University. The award is presented at the annual West Chester University Poetry Event each spring.

Past winners
The following are the winners of the Donald Justice Poetry Prize:
2006  Kate Light, Gravity's Dream: New Poems and Sonnets
2007  Kim Bridgford, In the Extreme: Sonnets about World Records
2008  John Poch, Two Men Fighting with a Knife
2009  Julie Kane, Jazz Funeral
2010  Ned Balbo, Trials of Edgar Poe and Other Poems
2011  Amit Majmudar, Heaven and Earth
2012  Joanna Pearson,  Oldest Mortal Myth
2013  Anne-MarieThompson, Audiation
2014  Susan McLean, The Whetstone Misses the Knife
2014  Stephen Gibson, Rorschach Art Too
2015  Jeff Hardin, Restoring the Narrative
2015  Pat Valdata, Where No Man Can Touch
2017  Ryan Wilson, The Stranger World
2018  Chad Abushanab, The Last Visit
2019  Katherine Barrett Swett, Voice Message
2020  John Foy, No One Leaves the World Unhurt
2021  Alexis Sears, Out of Order

References

American poetry awards